is a Japanese professional baseball player. He plays for the Tohoku Rakuten Golden Eagles of the Pacific League in Nippon Professional Baseball.

Tohoku Rakuten Golden Eagles

In 2013, Norimoto's rookie season, he pitched to a 15-8 win–loss record and a 3.34 earned run average. Norimoto won the Pacific League Rookie of the Year Award.

In 2015, Norimoto led the Pacific League in strikeouts for the second straight season, with 215.  His 194.2 innings also led the league.  He finished third in ERA with a 2.91 mark.  Despite these achievements, Norimoto finished the season with a 10–11 record, his first losing campaign in his three years.

Samurai Japan

After the 2014 NPB season, Norimoto was named to the Samurai Japan national team that took on the MLB All-Stars in an exhibition series in Japan.  In Game 3 of that series at the Tokyo Dome on November 15, Norimoto pitched 5 perfect innings and struck out 6 with just 60 pitches and earned the win in what would turn out to be a combined no-hitter by Samurai Japan.  The MLB lineup featured six All-Stars but collected just four base runners, losing 4–0.

Playing style
Norimoto is a 5 ft 10 in, 180 lb right-handed pitcher. With a three-quarters delivery he throws a fastball, a forkball, and a solid slider. He recorded a career-high 98 mph when he worked in relief.

He won five times strikeout titles, and posting a K/9 of 9.4 in his NPB career.

References

External links

1990 births
2015 WBSC Premier12 players
2017 World Baseball Classic players
Japanese baseball players
Living people
Nippon Professional Baseball pitchers
Nippon Professional Baseball Rookie of the Year Award winners
Baseball people from Shiga Prefecture
Tohoku Rakuten Golden Eagles players